Catalonian Nights Vol. 2 is a live album by pianist Tete Montoliu recorded in Spain in 1980 and released on the Danish label, SteepleChase in 1989.

Track listing
 "I'll Remember April" (Gene de Paul, Pat Johnston, Don Raye) – 7:43
 "El Neu Carrer" (Joan Manuel Serrat) – 6:30
 "A Child Is Born" (Thad Jones) – 2:26
 "Tune-Up" (Miles Davis) – 5:53
 "Willow Weep for Me" (Ann Ronell) – 12:42 Bonus track on CD
 "Steeplechase" (Charlie Parker) – 7:40
 "My Old Flame" (Arthur Johnston, Sam Coslow) – 14:41
 "Doxy" (Sonny Rollins) – 9:17

Personnel
Tete Montoliu – piano
John Heard – bass
Albert Heath – drums

References

Tete Montoliu live albums
1989 live albums
SteepleChase Records live albums